Smygehamn is the southernmost locality situated in Trelleborg Municipality, Skåne County, Sweden (and thus Sweden's southernmost locality) with 1,278 inhabitants in 2010.

Between 1887–1957 Smygehamn had Sweden's southernmost railway station (called Östratorp after the parish).

Sweden's southernmost point, Smygehuk, is situated about 1 km to the south-west.

Notable natives and residents
Andreas Isaksson (football goalkeeper)

References

Populated places in Trelleborg Municipality
Populated places in Skåne County